Ahu Dasht (also Romanized as Āhū Dasht) is a village in Natel-e Restaq Rural District, Chamestan District, Nur County, Mazandaran Province, Iran. At the 2006 census, its population was 1,459, in 361 families.

References 

Populated places in Nur County